James Addison Baker may refer to:

 James A. Baker (born 1821) (1821–1897), American jurist and politician
 James A. Baker (born 1857) (1857–1941), American attorney
 James A. Baker Jr. (1892–1973), American attorney
 James A. Baker III (born 1930), American attorney, politician and diplomat

See also
James Baker (disambiguation)